The men's 1500 metre freestyle competition at the 2006 Pan Pacific Swimming Championships took place on August 20 at the Saanich Commonwealth Place. The last champion was Grant Hackett of Australia.

This event was a timed-final where each swimmer swam just once. The top 8 seeded swimmers swam in the evening, and the remaining swimmers swam in the morning session.

Records
Prior to this competition, the existing world and Pan Pacific records were as follows:

Results
All times are in minutes and seconds.

The first round was held on August 20, at 11:21, and the final was held on August 20, at 20:05.

References

2006 Pan Pacific Swimming Championships